"Help Somebody" is a song written by Jeffrey Steele and Kip Raines, and recorded by American country music duo Van Zant.  It was released in March 2005 as the first single from their album Get Right with the Man.  It peaked at number 8 in the United States. This song was their first entry on the country charts.

Music video
The music video was directed by Peter Zavadil.

Chart performance
"Help Somebody" debuted at number 44 on the U.S. Billboard Hot Country Singles & Tracks for the week of March 26, 2005.

Year-end charts

References

2005 songs
Van Zant (band) songs
2005 singles
Songs written by Jeffrey Steele
Music videos directed by Peter Zavadil
Columbia Records singles
Song recordings produced by Mark Wright (record producer)